Bryan Sheffield (born 1978) serves as Founder and Managing Partner of Formentera Partners, an energy focused private equity group. Prior to Formentera, Sheffield founded Parsley Energy, an independent oil and gas company where he served as CEO, Chairman of the Board, and Chairman Emeritus.

Early life and education
Bryan Sheffield is the son of Scott D. Sheffield, chief executive officer (CEO) of Pioneer Natural Resources. 
In 2001, he received a Bachelor of Business Administration in Finance from Southern Methodist University.

Career
In 2008, Sheffield founded Parsley Energy, taking over 109 old wells that his grandfather Joe Parsley had drilled in the Midland, Texas area. He had no previous experience in the energy business, just "family connections" and a "trader's taste for risk".

In January 2018, Sheffield announced he would resign from his role as CEO of Parsley Energy and become the executive chairman of the company.

In 2020, Sheffield founded Formentera Partners, an energy focused private equity group where he currently serves as Founder and Managing Partner.

Personal life
Sheffield is married, with two children, and lives in Austin, Texas.

In August 2019, Sheffield became a minority owner in Austin FC, a Major League Soccer expansion team based in Austin.

In 2019, Sheffield also launched the DropShot Tournament Series, a collection of professional tennis tournaments with a mission to help young athletes reach their full potential and support the Austin community. After three successful years hosting professional tennis events on the USTA / ITF World Tour and the UTR Ranking system, the DropShot Tournament Series hosted the ATX Open, a WTA 250 event on the Hologic WTA Tour, February 27 - March 5, 2023.

References

1978 births
American company founders
Austin FC owners
Living people
People from Austin, Texas
Southern Methodist University alumni